Emeran Anton Mayer (born July 26, 1950 in Traunstein, Germany) is a gastroenterologist, lecturer, author, editor, neuroscientist, documentary filmmaker and a professor in the Departments of Medicine, Physiology and Psychiatry at the David Geffen School of Medicine at UCLA. He is a pioneer of medical research into brain gut interactions

Early years
Mayer became interested in mind–brain–body interactions in health and chronic disease as a college student at Ludwig Maximilian University in Munich, which inspired his decision to go to medical school at Ludwig Maximilian University Medical School His interest in documentary filmmaking galvanized this fascination and resulted in his journeys to the Yanoama tribes in the Orinoco region, and the Asmat people in Irian Jaya. There, he filmed and studied native healers while exploring his suspicion that the interactions between the gut and the brain transcend culture and time.

Career

Mayer's research career began at the Institute of Physiology in Munich, with a dissertation on the mechanisms by which the brain affects coronary blood flow in the heart during psychological stress. After moving to the US, he completed his specialty training as a gastroenterologist at UCLA and from then on focused his work on basic, translational, and clinical aspects of brain gut interactions. He has 40 years of experience studying clinical and neurobiological aspects of how the digestive and nervous systems interact in health and disease. In the United States Mayer's research has continuously been funded by federal grants from  National Institutes of Health (NIH) grants.

Mayer is a Distinguished Research Professor and the Executive Director of the Oppenheimer Family Center for Neurobiology of Stress, and Co-director of the CURE: Digestive Diseases Research Center at UCLA. He has published more than 370 scientific papers (h-index 115), and co edited 3 scientific books.  He is the recipient of the 2016 David McLean award from the American Psychosomatic Society and the 2017 Ismar Boas Medal from the German Society of Gastroenterology and Metabolic Disease. 
As one of the pioneers and leading researchers in the role of mind-brain-body interactions in health and chronic disease, his scientific contributions to U.S. national and international communities in the broad area of basic and translational enteric neurobiology with wide-ranging applications in clinical GI diseases and disorders is unparalleled. By incorporating microbiome science into his longstanding interest in brain gut interactions, he has been studying the role of the gut microbiome in influencing brain structure and function, as he explained on National Public Radio. Dr. Mayer spoke at UCLA TEDx on The Mysterious Origins of Gut Feelings. In addition to his longstanding research into the pathophysiology of irritable bowel syndrome, his funded research efforts have expanded into the areas of cognitive decline and Alzheimer's disease, and Parkinson's disease, food addiction and obesity, inflammatory bowel disorders such as ulcerative colitis and Crohn's disease. His research efforts into these brain gut diseases have been closely linked to his strong belief in the concept of One Health, which closely links individual health, with health of the microbiome in our gut and in the soil, health of the plants and the planet. Mayer has a longstanding interest in ancient healing traditions and affords them a level of respect rarely found in Western Medicine. He has personally practiced different mind based strategies, including Zen meditation, Ericksonian hypnosis, and autogenic training and his approach to patients is based on an integrative medicine concept of the close bidirectional interactions between mind, brain, body and the environment.

Books

 Basic And Clinical Aspects Of Chronic Abdominal Pain New York: Elsevier, 1993. 
 The Biological Basis Of Mind Body Interactions  Progress in Brain Research, Vol. 122, Amsterdam: Elsevier, 2000., Vol. 122, Amsterdam: Elsevier, 2000.
 Functional Chronic Pain Syndromes: Similarities And Differences In Clinical Presentation And Pathophysiology Seattle, IASP Press, 2009
 The Mind-Gut Connection: How the Astonishing Dialogue Taking Place in Our Bodies Impacts Health, Weight, and Mood HarperCollins, 2016.
 The Gut-Immune Connection: How Understanding Why We are Sick Can Help Us Regain Our Health HarperCollins, 2021

Movies

  In Search of Balance, 2018.  Associate Producer, 2018
  Interconnected Planet.  Producer and co-Director, 2021

Personal

Mayer lives in Los Angeles, California. He is married to Minou Mayer and has one son, Emeran Dylan Mayer.

References

1950 births
Living people
German gastroenterologists
American neuroscientists
Ludwig Maximilian University of Munich alumni
David Geffen School of Medicine at UCLA faculty
American gastroenterologists
German neuroscientists
German emigrants to the United States
People from Traunstein